Huanghai Bus is a bus manufacturer based in Dandong, Liaoning, China, and a subsidiary of SG Automotive. It was founded in 1951. 

Huanghai has an annual production capacity of around 5,000 buses and 6,000 chassis sets. It produces around 20 bus series and 160 models, with vehicles ranging in length from 8 to over 18 meters. Huanghai manufactures buses based on MAN and IVECO technology.

References

External links 
 Huanghai Bus official site
 SG Automotive official site

Bus manufacturers of China
Companies based in Liaoning
Vehicle manufacturing companies established in 1951
Chinese brands
Chinese companies established in 1951